Mount Bodziony is a bluff-type mountain with a steep west rock face, rising to over 400 m at the north end of Hunt Bluff, Bear Peninsula, on Walgreen Coast, Marie Byrd Land. Named by Advisory Committee on Antarctic Names (US-ACAN) in 1977 after Maj. Ronald Bodziony, USA, Terminal Operations Officer, U.S. Navy Operation Deepfreeze, 1973–76.

Mountains of Marie Byrd Land